Pope Innocent I was the bishop of Rome from 401 to his death on 12 March 417. From the beginning of his papacy, he was seen as the general arbitrator of ecclesiastical disputes in both the East and the West. He confirmed the prerogatives of the Archbishop of Thessalonica, and issued a decretal on disciplinary matters referred to him by the Bishop of Rouen. He defended the exiled John Chrysostom and consulted with the bishops of Africa concerning the Pelagian controversy, confirming the decisions of the African synods. The Catholic priest-scholar Johann Peter Kirsch, 1500 years later, described Innocent as a very energetic and highly gifted individual "...who fulfilled admirably the duties of his office".

Family background
According to his biographer in the Liber Pontificalis, Innocent was a native of Albano Laziale and the son of a man called Innocentius, but his contemporary Jerome referred to him as the son of the previous pope, Anastasius I in a letter to Demetrias. However, scholars have proposed that Jerome was merely describing a hierarchical relationship rather than a biological one. According to Urbano Cerri, Pope Innocent was a native of Albania.

Pontificate
Innocent I lost no opportunity in maintaining and extending the authority of the Roman apostolic See, which was seen as the ultimate resort for the settlement of all ecclesiastical disputes. His communications with Victricius of Rouen, Exuperius of Toulouse, Alexander of Antioch and others, as well as his actions on the appeal made to him by John Chrysostom against Theophilus of Alexandria, show that opportunities of this kind were numerous and varied. He took a decided view on the Pelagian controversy, confirming the decisions of the synod of the province of proconsular Africa, held in Carthage in 416, confirming the condemnation which had been pronounced in 411 against Cælestius, who shared the views of Pelagius. He also wrote in the same year in a similar sense to the fathers of the Numidian synod of Mileve who had addressed him. Soon after this, five African bishops, among them St. Augustine, wrote a personal letter to Innocent regarding their own position in the matter of Pelagianism. In addition he acted as metropolitan over the bishops of Italia Suburbicaria.

The historian Zosimus in his Historia Nova suggests that during the sack of Rome in 410 by Alaric I, Innocent I was willing to permit private pagan practices as a temporary measure. However, Zosimus also suggests that this attempt by pagans to restore public worship failed due to lack of public interest, suggesting that Rome had been successfully Christianized in the last century.

Among Innocent I's letters is one to Jerome and another to John II, Bishop of Jerusalem, regarding annoyances to which the former had been subjected by the Pelagians at Bethlehem.

He died on 12 March 417. Accordingly, his feast day is now celebrated on 12 March, though from the thirteenth to the twentieth century he was commemorated on 28 July. His successor was Zosimus.

In 405 A.D. Pope Innocent sent a list of the sacred books to a Gallic bishop, Exsuperius of Toulouse, identical with that of Trent (which took place more than 1000 years later), except for some uncertainty in the manuscript tradition about whether the letters ascribed to Paul were 14 or only 13, in the latter case possibly implying omission of the Epistle to the Hebrews. Previously in 367 A.D., Athanasius of Alexandria had circulated the 39th Easter Letter mentioning the list of Scripture, both Old and New Testament, which he referred to as "canonized".

Relics
In 846, Pope Sergius II gave approval for the relics of St. Innocent to be moved by Duke Liudolf of Saxony, along with those of his father and predecessor Anastasius, to the crypt of the former collegiate church of Gandersheim, now Gandersheim Abbey, where most rest until this day. Relics were also brought to The Church of Our Lady St Mary of Glastonbury upon its consecration.

See also

List of Catholic saints
List of popes

References

External links 

 
 Opera Omnia by Migne Patrologia Latina
 Fontes Latinae de papis usque ad annum 530 (Papa Felix IV)
 Liber pontificalis

 

378 births
417 deaths
People from Albano Laziale
Italian popes
Papal saints
5th-century archbishops
5th-century Christian saints
5th-century Romans
Saints from Roman Italy
Papal family members
Year of birth unknown
5th-century popes
5th-century Latin writers
Latin letter writers
Popes